Ray Herring (born 24 September 1967) is an Australian rugby league former professional rugby league footballer who played professionally for three Queensland clubs in Australia during the 1980s and 1990s.  Herring was the player who threw the pass that hit Mario Fenech in the head, leading to the term “Falcon”.

Background
Herring attended Oakey State High and in 1984 was part of the Australian Schoolboys team.

Playing career
In 1988, he made his first grade debut for the Brisbane Broncos. Herring remained with the Broncos for the next three seasons but was only used sparingly and from the bench.

In 1991 he switched clubs, joining the Gold Coast. Herring played in fifty six matches for the club over the next four years and often started at hooker. However the club was not competitive.

In 1995, Herring returned to Brisbane, joining the new South Queensland Crushers franchise. He played in their inaugural match on 11 March 1995 but only played in five other matches throughout the season before retiring.

References

1967 births
Living people
Australian rugby league players
Brisbane Broncos players
Gold Coast Chargers players
Place of birth missing (living people)
Rugby league hookers
Rugby league players from Queensland
South Queensland Crushers players